Gang Banged With a Headache, and Live is a live album by American math rock band Don Caballero. Released in 2012, it features songs from the band's discography performed by a line-up consisting of members Damon Che, Jeff Ellsworth, Gene Doyle, and Jason Jouver.

Track listing

Personnel

Don Caballero 

 Damon Che – drums
 Jason Jouver - bass guitar
 Gene Doyle – guitar
 Jeff Ellsworth – guitar

Technical 

 Corey Barnes – mixing
 Carl Saff – mastering
 David Woodruff – layout
 Damon Che – photography

References 

Live albums
Don Caballero albums
Math rock albums
Instrumental rock albums